Adrafinil, sold under the brand name Olmifon, is a wakefulness-promoting medication that was formerly used in France to improve alertness, attention, wakefulness, and mood, particularly in the elderly. It was also used off-label by individuals who wished to avoid fatigue, such as night workers or others who needed to stay awake and alert for long periods of time. Additionally, the medication has been used non-medically as a nootropic.

Adrafinil is a prodrug; it is primarily metabolized in vivo to modafinil, resulting in very similar pharmacological effects. Unlike modafinil, however, it takes time for the metabolite to accumulate to active levels in the bloodstream. Effects usually are apparent within 45–60 minutes when taken orally on an empty stomach.

Adrafinil was marketed in France until September 2011 when it was voluntarily discontinued due to an unfavorable risk–benefit ratio.

Medical uses
Adrafinil is a wakefulness-promoting agent and was used to promote alertness, attention, wakefulness, and mood. It was particularly used in the elderly.

Available forms
Adrafinil was available in the form of 300mg oral tablets.

Side effects
There is a case report of two patients that adrafinil may increase interest in sex.

A case report of adrafinil-induced orofacial dyskinesia exists. Reports of this side effect also exist for modafinil.

Pharmacology

Pharmacodynamics
Because α1-adrenergic receptor antagonists were found to block effects of adrafinil and modafinil in animals, "most investigators assume[d] that adrafinil and modafinil both serve as α1-adrenergic receptor agonists." However, adrafinil and modafinil have not been found to bind to the α1-adrenergic receptor and they lack peripheral sympathomimetic side effects associated with activation of this receptor; hence, the evidence in support of this hypothesis is weak, and other mechanisms are probable. Modafinil was subsequently screened at a variety of targets in 2009 and was found to act as a weak, atypical blocker of the dopamine transporter (and hence as a dopamine reuptake inhibitor), and this action may explain some or all of its pharmacological effects. Relative to adrafinil, modafinil possesses greater specificity in its action, lacking or having a reduced incidence of many of the common side effects of the former (including stomach pain, skin irritation, anxiety, and elevated liver enzymes with prolonged use).

Pharmacokinetics
In addition to modafinil, adrafinil also produces modafinil acid (CRL-40467) and modafinil sulfone (CRL-41056) as metabolites, which form from metabolic modification of modafinil.

Chemistry
Analogues of adrafinil include modafinil, armodafinil, CRL-40,940, CRL-40,941, and fluorenol.

History
Adrafinil was discovered in 1974 by two chemists working for the French pharmaceutical company Laboratoires Lafon who were screening compounds in search of analgesics. Pharmacological studies of adrafinil instead revealed psychostimulant-like effects such as hyperactivity and wakefulness in animals. The substance was first tested in humans, specifically for the treatment of narcolepsy, in 1977–1978. Introduced by Lafon (now Cephalon), it reached the market in France in 1984, and for the treatment of narcolepsy in 1985.

In 1976, two years after the discovery of adrafinil, modafinil, its active metabolite, was discovered. Modafinil appeared to be more potent than adrafinil in animal studies, and was selected for further clinical development, with both adrafinil and modafinil eventually reaching the market. Modafinil was first approved in France in 1994, and then in the United States in 1998. Lafon was acquired by Cephalon in 2001. As of September 2011, Cephalon has discontinued Olmifon, its adrafinil product, while modafinil continues to be marketed.

Society and culture

Names
It is also known by its brand name Olmifon and its developmental code name CRL-40028.

Regulation

Athletic doping
Adrafinil and its active metabolite modafinil were added to the list of substances prohibited for athletic competition according to World Anti-Doping Agency in 2004.

New Zealand
In 2005 a Medical Classification Committee in New Zealand recommended to MEDSAFE NZ that adrafinil be classified as a prescription medicine due to risks of it being used as a party drug.  At that time adrafinil was not scheduled in New Zealand.

Research
In a clinical trial with the tricyclic antidepressant clomipramine and placebo as comparators, adrafinil showed efficacy in the treatment of depression. In contrast to clomipramine however, adrafinil was well-tolerated, and showed greater improvement in psychomotor retardation in comparison. The authors concluded that further investigation of the potential antidepressant effects of adrafinil were warranted.

References

External links
 
 
  
 

CYP3A4 inducers
Dopamine reuptake inhibitors
Drugs with unknown mechanisms of action
Hydroxamic acids
Nootropics
Phenyl compounds
Prodrugs
Stimulants
Sulfoxides
Withdrawn drugs
World Anti-Doping Agency prohibited substances